Hrușova is a commune in Criuleni District, Moldova. It is composed of three villages: Chetroasa, Ciopleni and Hrușova.

References

Communes of Criuleni District